Intecymbium is a monotypic genus of South American dwarf spiders containing the single species, Intecymbium antarcticum. It was first described by J. A. Miller in 2007, and has only been found in Argentina and Chile.

See also
 List of Linyphiidae species (I–P)

References

Linyphiidae
Monotypic Araneomorphae genera
Spiders of South America